"The World as It Is" is a song by Australian singer-song writer, Daryl Braithwaite, released in October 1993, as the lead single from his fourth studio album, Taste the Salt.

Simon Hussey won an ARIA award for Engineer of the Year for his work on this track, and "Barren Ground" at the ARIA Music Awards of 1994.

Track listing
CD single
 "The World as It Is" – 3:52
 "In  the Distance (Getting Closer)" – 5:21

Charts
"The World as It Is" debuted at number 41, and peaked at 35 three weeks later.

References

1993 songs
1993 singles
Columbia Records singles
Song recordings produced by Simon Hussey
Daryl Braithwaite songs
Songs written by Tina Harris